ONE: Full Circle was a Combat sport event produced by ONE Championship that took place on February 25, 2022, at the Singapore Indoor Stadium in Kallang, Singapore.

Background
A ONE Middleweight World Championship bout between reigning champion Reinier de Ridder and title challenger Kiamrian Abbasov was scheduled as the main event. Two additional title fights were later added as well a ONE Light Heavyweight Kickboxing World Championship bout between the champion Roman Kryklia and challenger Murat Aygun, as well as a ONE Featherweight Muay Thai World Championship between champion Petchmorakot Petchyindee and challenger Jamal Yusupov.

Jamal Yusupov and David Branch, but the two veterans have been forced to withdraw from their respective matchups.

Results

Bonus awards
The following fighters received $50,000 bonuses.
Performance of the Night: Reinier de Ridder and Roman Kryklia

See also 

 2022 in ONE Championship
 List of ONE Championship events
 List of current ONE fighters

References 

Events in Singapore
ONE Championship events
2022 in mixed martial arts
Mixed martial arts in Singapore
Sports competitions in Singapore
February 2022 sports events in Singapore